Plain Dealing is a town in Bossier Parish, Louisiana, United States. The population was 893 in 2020. It is part of the Shreveport–Bossier City metropolitan statistical area.

History
Prior to 1839, the United States government forcibly removed the Caddo Nation of Native Americans—longtime local inhabitants who had first settled the area over 1,000 years before Europeans' 16th-century arrival in mainland North America—from the area of Northern Louisiana that included the parcel that would later become the town of Plain Dealing.

In 1839, George Oglethorpe Gilmer and his son, James Blair Gilmer, bought 5,000 acres of this land—now described as a "vast, unsettled wilderness"—from the United States government, calling a portion of this acreage "Plain Dealing" after the family's Virginia plantation.  The "Plain Dealing" name became official when the town was formally chartered on April 24, 1890.

Notable points of more recent history include the following:
 Plain Dealing recorded the state's hottest temperature ever, on August 10, 1936 (see "Climate" section below).
 The Plain Dealing Post newspaper was established in the 1980s by publisher Danny D. Scott of nearby Springhill.
 The Bossier Parish minimum security prison is located in Plain Dealing.

Geography

Climate

Demographics

As of the 2020 United States census, there were 893 people, 424 households, and 192 families residing in the town.

Notable people
 William Benton Boggs (1854–1922), first mayor of Plain Dealing in 1890; member of the Louisiana House of Representatives from 1892 to 1900, and the Louisiana State Senate from 1908 to 1916 
Robert Houston Curry, was from 1888 to 1892 a member of the Louisiana House of Representatives for Bossier Parish.
 John J. Doles (1895–1970), a business man and politician, member of the Louisiana State Senate from 1952 to 1956, and president of the Louisiana Bankers Association from 1956 to 1957
 Ryan Gatti (born 1974), state senator from Bossier City since 2016; owns a tree farm near Plain Dealing
Booker T (born 1965), American professional wrestler and promoter.
 A. P. Tugwell (1889–1976), born in Plain Dealing; the longest-serving Louisiana state treasurer
 Joseph David "Joe" Waggonner, Jr. (1918–2007), a former congressman; born in Plain Dealing and interred at Plain Dealing Cemetery.
 W. E. "Willie" Waggonner (1905–1976), sheriff of Bossier Parish from 1948 until his death in office; brother of Joe Waggonner
 Greg Stumon  A Former Professional Football Player (1963-Now)

Gallery

References

Towns in Louisiana
Towns in Bossier Parish, Louisiana
Towns in Shreveport – Bossier City metropolitan area
1890 establishments in Louisiana